GEIPAN (an acronym for Groupe d'Études et d'Informations sur les Phénomènes Aérospatiaux Non-identifiés, or unidentified aerospace phenomenon research and information group)., its name since September 2005. (The group was formerly known as GEPAN from 1977 to 1988, and SEPRA from 1988 to 2004), is a unit of the French Space Agency CNES whose brief is to investigate unidentified aerospace phenomena (UAP), and make its findings available to the public.

The French Gendarmerie was instructed to channel data from reports of UFO sightings to SEPRA, which therefore was in a position to draw on a large database of such events. In cases where physical traces appeared to be present, SEPRA could call on the technical resources of CNES to perform a thorough scientific investigation. A famous example of such an investigation was in the Trans-en-Provence Case.

In March 2007, GEIPAN started to make its archives available online to the public.

French skeptics have criticized the quality of the work of the GEPAN.

In March 26, 2007, the CNES own report says 28% of sightings remain unidentifed.

See also
List of UFO organizations

References

External links 
  GEIPAN official site
 Goals and history of GEIPAN on the CNES website.
 From GEPAN to SEPRA: Official UFO studies in France (International UFO Review, winter 2000–2001), the earlier years of GEIPAN related by Gildas Bourdais.

CNES
Government responses to UFOs
1977 establishments in France
Organizations established in 1977
Space program of France
UFO organizations